Timothy Harold Parks (born 19 December 1954) is a British novelist, translator, author and professor of literature.

Career
He is the author of eighteen novels (notably Europa, which was shortlisted for the Booker Prize in 1997). His first novel, Tongues of Flame, won both the Betty Trask Award and Somerset Maugham Award in 1986. In the same year, Parks was awarded the Mail on Sunday/John Llewellyn Rhys Prize for Loving Roger. Other highly praised titles were Shear, Destiny, Judge Savage, Cleaver, and In Extremis. He has also had a number of stories published in The New Yorker.

Since the 1990s Parks has written frequently for both the London Review of Books and The New York Review of Books, as well as publishing various works of non-fiction, most notably A Season with Verona, shortlisted for the William Hill Sports Book of the Year and Teach Us to Sit Still, shortlisted for the Wellcome Book Prize.

Between 1993 and 2019 Parks taught as a university professor at IULM University, Milan. He is also a translator and has translated works by Alberto Moravia, Antonio Tabucchi, Italo Calvino, Roberto Calasso, Niccolò Machiavelli, Giacomo Leopardi, and Fleur Jaeggy. His non-fiction book Translating Style has been described as "canonical in the field of translation studies". He twice won the John Florio Prize for translations from the Italian. In 2011 he co-curated the exhibition Money and Beauty: Bankers, Botticelli and the Bonfire of the Vanities at Palazzo Strozzi in Florence, and a book of the same title, edited by Ludovica Sebregondi and Tim Parks, was published in 2012 by Giunti. . The exhibition was loosely based on Parks' book Medici Money: Banking, Metaphysics, and Art in Fifteenth-Century Florence.

Personal life
Parks married Rita Baldassarre in 1979. The couple have three children. They divorced in 2017.

Bibliography

Fiction

 
 
Home Thoughts, 1987.
Family Planning, 1989. The trials and tribulations of a mother, father and their children as they cope with the unexpected and sometimes violent behaviour of Raymond, who is suffering from a mental illness but will not agree to professional help.
Cara Massimina, 1990, a murder story first published under the pseudonym "John MacDowell", but later in the author's own name. Later released in the US under the title Juggling the Stars.
Goodness, 1991.
Shear, 1993.
Mimi's Ghost, 1995, sequel of Cara Massimina.
Europa, 1997. 
Destiny, 1999.
Judge Savage, 2003.
Rapids, 2005.
Talking About It, 2005. A collection of short stories.
Cleaver, 2006.
Dreams of Rivers and Seas, 2008.
The Server, 2012. Subsequently published as Sex is Forbidden: A Novel.
Painting Death, 2014. Book 3 in the Cara Massimina trilogy.
Thomas and Mary: A Love Story, 2016.
In Extremis, 2017.
Italian Life: A Modern Fable of Loyalty and Betrayal, 2020.
Hotel Milano, 2023.

Non-fiction

Italian Neighbours, 1992. Relates how the author and his wife came to a small town near Verona and how they integrate and become accustomed to the unusual habits of their newfound neighbours. 
An Italian Education, 1996. Follow up to Italian Neighbours and recounts the milestones in the life of the author's children as they progress through the Italian school system. 
Translating Style, 1997.
Adultery and Other Diversions, 1999.
Hell and Back: Reflections on Writers and Writing from Dante to Rushdie, 2001.
A Season With Verona, following the fortunes of Hellas Verona F.C. in season 2000–2001. 
Medici Money: Banking, Metaphysics, and Art in Fifteenth-Century Florence, 2005.
The Fighter: Essays, 2007.
Teach Us to Sit Still: A Sceptic's Search for Health and Healing, 2010, Harvill Secker, . In this book, Parks describes his search for relief from chronic prostatitis/chronic pelvic pain syndrome (CPPS). His urologist thinks surgery will be the only solution, but after several examinations, no clear cause is found for the pain. Parks wonders if the pain can be (partly) psychosomatic. In his search, he reads the book A Headache in the Pelvis: The Definitive Guide to Understanding and Treating Chronic Pelvic Pain by psychologist (and long time CPPS-sufferer) David Wise and neurourologist Rodney Anderson (Stanford University), in which the authors describe methods of 'paradoxical relaxation' to prevent chronic tensing of the pelvic musculature. Parks starts doing the recommended relaxation-exercises daily, and later on, also practices Vipassana-meditation. He experiences his body and life in a new way, and the pain diminishes for the most part.
Italian Ways: On and Off the Rails from Milan to Palermo, 2013.
Where I’m Reading From: The Changing World of Books, 2014.
The Novel: A Survival Skill, 2015.
A Literary Tour of Italy, 2015.
Life and Work: Writers, Readers, and the Conversations Between Them, 2016.
Out of My Head: On the Trail of Consciousness, 2018.
 "Her Programme," in Writers and Their Mothers, Dale Salwak, ed., 2018.
 
Pen in Hand: Reading, Rereading and Other Mysteries, 2019.
 
The Hero's Way: Walking with Garibaldi from Rome to Ravenna, 2021.

Translations of Italian works

Alberto Moravia, Erotic Tales, Secker & Warburg, 1985. Original title La cosa.
Alberto Moravia, The Voyeur, Secker & Warburg, 1986. Original title L'uomo che guarda.
Antonio Tabucchi, Indian Nocturne, Chatto & Windus, 1988. Original title Notturno indiano.
Alberto Moravia, Journey to Rome, Secker & Warburg, 1989. Original title Viaggio a Roma.
Antonio Tabucchi, Vanishing Point, Chatto & Windus, 1989. Original title Il filo dell'orizzonte.
Antonio Tabucchi, The Woman of Porto Pim, Chatto & Windus, 1989. Original title La donna di Porto Pim.
Antonio Tabucchi, The Flying Creatures of Fra Angelico, Chatto & Windus, 1989. Original title I volatili del Beato Angelico.
Fleur Jaeggy, Sweet Days of Discipline, Heinemann, 1991. Original title I beati anni del castigo. The translation won the John Florio Prize.
Giuliana Tedeschi, There is a Place on Earth: A Woman in Birkenau, Pantheon Books, 1992. Original title C'è un punto della terra.
Roberto Calasso, The Marriage of Cadmus and Harmony, Knopf, 1993. Original title Le nozze di Cadmo e Armonia. The translation won the Italo Calvino Prize.
Italo Calvino, The Road to San Giovanni, Pantheon Books, 1993. Original title La strada di San Giovanni. The translation won the John Florio Prize.
Italo Calvino, Numbers in the Dark, Pantheon Books, 1995. Original title Prima che tu dica pronto.
Fleur Jaeggy, Last Vanities, New Directions, 1998. Original title La paura del cielo.
Roberto Calasso, Ka, New York: Knopf, 1998. Original title Ka.
Roberto Calasso, Literature and the Gods, New York: Knopf, 2000. Original title La letteratura e gli dei.
Niccolò Machiavelli, The Prince, Penguin Classics, 2009. Original title Principe.
Giacomo Leopardi, Passions, Penguin Classics, 2014. Original title Le passioni.
Cesare Pavese, The Moon and the Bonfires, Penguin Classics, 2021. Original title La luna e i falò.

Secondary literature
 2003: Gillian Fenwick: Understanding Tim Parks. University of South Carolina Press, Columbia, .
 2001: Gillian Fenwick: "Tim Parks (19 December 1954 - )," in Dictionary of Literary Biography, vol. 231: British Novelists Since 1960, Fourth Series. United States Gale, .

Notes

External links

Interview with Tim Parks by Scott Esposito in Bomb
Interview with Tim Parks in The Quarterly Conversation, 4 March 2013.
Interview with 3:AM
Review of Destiny at Spike Magazine
Review of Europa at The Occasional Review
Parks author page and archive from The New York Review of Books
Parks author page and archive from The London Review of Books
Official website of Tim Parks
Without Illusions: Jonathan J. Clarke interviews Tim Parks, Los Angeles Review of Books, 6 July 2016.

1954 births
Living people
20th-century English male writers
20th-century British novelists
21st-century English male writers
21st-century British novelists
Alumni of Downing College, Cambridge
British male novelists
British non-fiction writers
Harvard University alumni
John Llewellyn Rhys Prize winners
Literary translators
New Statesman people
The New York Review of Books people
Postmodern writers
Writers from Manchester
English expatriates in Italy
Male non-fiction writers